Jason McCartney may refer to:

Jason McCartney (politician) (born 1968), Member of Parliament for Colne Valley UK Parliament constituency until June 2017
Jason McCartney (footballer) (born 1974), former Australian rules footballer and coach of the AIS/AFL Academy
Jason McCartney (cyclist) (born 1973), American professional road racing cyclist